Lomatium tracyi is a species of flowering plant in the carrot family known by the common name Tracy's desertparsley, or Tracy's lomatium. It is native to the mountains of northern California and southern Oregon, where it grows in the forests on the slopes, often on serpentine soils. It is a perennial herb growing up to 35 centimeters tall from a slender taproot. There is generally no stem, the leaves and inflorescence emerging at ground level. The leaf blades are divided and subdivided into a mass of overlapping threadlike to oval segments. The inflorescence is an umbel of yellow flowers.

External links
Jepson Manual Treatment
USDA Plants Profile
Photo gallery

tracyi
Flora of California
Flora of Oregon
Flora of the Cascade Range
Flora of the Klamath Mountains
Endemic flora of the United States
Taxa named by Lincoln Constance
Taxa named by Mildred Esther Mathias
Flora without expected TNC conservation status